Gregory Park railway station opened in 1845 and closed in 1992. It served the Gregory Park sugar estate on the Kingston to Montego Bay line,  from the Kingston terminus. It was destroyed by fire sometime after closure.

The station was a two-story, timber building The ground floor had timber doors and sash windows. The upper floor was partially cantilevered using a series of angled timber arms to the upper front elevation to form a canopy over the platform with a veranda above. The roof of the building was a T-shaped gable end.

Fares
In 1910 the third class fare from Gregory Park to Kingston was 6d (sixpence); first class was about double.

See also
Railway stations in Jamaica

External links
Aerial view of site.
Stamps and ticket: .

References

Railway stations in Jamaica
Buildings and structures in Saint Catherine Parish
Railway stations opened in 1845
Railway stations closed in 1992

Railway stations in Jamaica opened in 1845